Bradford College is a further and higher education college in Bradford, West Yorkshire, England, with approximately 25,000 students. The college offers a range of full and part-time courses from introductory level through to postgraduate level and caters for a variety of students, including school leavers, adults wanting to return to education, degree-level students and those seeking professional qualifications.

HE provision
Bradford College is one of the FE Colleges with the largest HE provision in England, with approximately 170 full and part-time HE courses.

The College's HE provision is currently validated by University of Bolton, having previously been validated by Teesside University.

The move to Teesside University was a result of Leeds Metropolitan University's withdrawal from its partnerships with colleges except for foundation degrees.

History
In 1832, the Bradford Mechanics Institute was founded. In 1863, the institute had grown to accommodate full-time staff and had its own School of Industrial Design and Art. In 1872 the Bradford MP William Edward Forster opened new buildings in Bridge Street.

On 23 June 1882, the then Prince and Princess of Wales (later King Edward VII and Queen Alexandra) came to open the new School. They were given a very warm welcome: "From Saltaire Station to the Technical School, a distance of four miles, was one continuous avenue of Venetian masts, streamers, and many coloured banners, while at appropriate points triumphal arches of great magnificence were erected."

In 1982, the institution was named Bradford and Ilkley Community College, after a merger with Ilkley College, giving the combined college a small satellite campus in the nearby town of Ilkley, north-east of Bradford. This was closed in 1999 and soon after the institution became Bradford College.

In 2002, a merger between the college and the University of Bradford was proposed; this was pursued until the summer of 2003, when the two institutions issued a joint statement calling off the merger. Beginning in 2006 the college underwent a re-brand and unveiled its current logo. A community learning centre, named The Three Valleys Centre, was opened in nearby Keighley in 2007 which hosts a hairdressing and beauty salon (also operating on a commercial basis), as well as I.T and a range of language courses.

As part of the college's 175-year celebration, it published a list of 175 famous alumni of the college. This list includes ex-students such as Edward Appleton, Tasmin Archer, David Berglas, Alex Corina, Bob Hardy, David Hockney and Joyce Gould.

Trinity Green, which houses a new sports centre and teaching facilities for construction and engineering students, opened in September 2008, housed in a new purpose-built building on the site of MacMillan Halls of Residence which were demolished in 2007. A second phase of building replaced the Westbrook and Randall Well buildings with a more modern structure. Government funding was put on hold for this project in March 2009 and was not expected to be available again until 2011. The new building, named the David Hockney Building after one its most famous alumni, opened in September 2014 after two years of construction. A new Advanced Technology Centre was scheduled to open in September 2015 on a nearby former car park.

The College received the go-ahead by the Skills Funding Agency for a £50 million building. The project is the second phase of the College's Accommodation Strategy started with the opening of the Trinity Green Campus:

Bradford College's Appleton Building was named after the Bradford scientist Edward Victor Appleton, and the College's Lister Building was named after Samuel Lister.

Quality assurance
As an institution in receipt of government funding Bradford College is regularly inspected by Ofsted and the QAA. The last reports from 2008 (Ofsted) and 2010 (QAA) confirmed the high quality of the provision and identified a number of good practices across the institution.

Ofsted inspection in 2017 gave the college a 'Requires Improvement' grading in most areas. The Initial Teacher Education inspected by Ofsted in 2010 also resulted in good and outstanding grades.

The latest Ofsted inspection was done on 9 November 2021 and found that the College was Good.

Campuses
The main campus is situated on Great Horton Road close to Bradford city centre. However, some courses are delivered elsewhere. The Academy is located in the Three Valleys Centre in Keighley. There are several other campuses in Bradford, such as Bolton Royd on Manningham Lane or Appleton Academy in Wyke. Part-time leisure, community and some of the ESOL courses are offered in over 20 different locations across Bradford.

Bradford College Education Trust
Bradford College is the sponsor of three secondary schools as part of the Bradford College Education Trust. the three schools are Appleton Academy, Bradford Studio School and Samuel Lister Academy.

Erasmus participation
Bradford College participates in the Erasmus Programme. The College is in agreement with 26 institutions across 14 European countries:

Başkent University, Turkey
European University Cyprus, Cyprus
Hacettepe University, Turkey
Miguel de Cervantes European University, Spain
University of Rennes 1, France
Zagreb School of Economics and Management, Croatia
Humak University of Applied Sciences, Finland
Fırat University, Turkey
Ecole Supérieure des Arts Appliqués et du Textile, France
Novia University of Applied Sciences, Finland
Jan Dlugosz University in Czestochowa, Poland
Károli Gáspár Református Egyetem, Hungary
Katholieke Hogeschool Limburg, Belgium
Kirchliche Pädagogische Hochschule in Vienna, Austria
Haute Ecole Namuroise Catholique, Belgium
Marnix Academie, The Netherlands
Universidad de Córdoba, Spain
Universidad de Granada, Spain
University College Lillebaelt, Denmark
University of Crete, Greece
University of Gdansk, Poland
University of Lower Silesia, Poland
UPV/EHU Bilbao, Spain
Bozok University, Turkey
Laurea University of Applied Sciences, Finland

Trivia
Bradford College's Trinity Green Campus is also home to the "Dragons Den" where EBL division 2 basketball Team Bradford Dragons play their home matches on Saturday evenings.

Bradford College students broke the record for the biggest onion bhaji in 2011 and the biggest samosa in 2012.

The management of the College caused a stir when a journalist found out it had ordered a mace worth £22,000 to enhance the students' experience during the graduation ceremony in December 2011.

Bradford College Students' Union was awarded the Further Education Students' Union of the Year title at the NUS 2013 Awards Ceremony.

Notable people

Alumni
 Alex Corina, artist and community activist
 Gloria de Piero, Labour MP for Ashfield
 Sir Edmund Elton, 8th Baronet, ceramics artist and inventor
 Richard Eurich, artist and landscape painter
 Graham Fransella, painter
 Andy Goldsworthy, artist
 David Hockney, artist
 Yvonne McGregor, racing cyclist
 Mick Manning, illustrator and children's author
 Donald Rooum, cartoonist
 Paul Sample, cartoonist
 Robert E. Swindells, author

Lecturers
 Kim Leadbeater, Labour Co-op politician
 Alice Mahon, trade unionist and Labour Party politician

Unclear
 Trevor Bell, artist
 Major General Dudley Graham Johnson  & Bar, MC (13 February 1884 – 21 December 1975), British Army officer and recipient of the Victoria Cross

See also
Listed buildings in Bradford (City Ward)

References

External links

Education in Bradford
Further education colleges in West Yorkshire
Higher education colleges in England
Educational institutions established in 1832
1832 establishments in England